Soe Thiha, also known as Maung Tuu (born 1 January 1974), is a Burmese politician who currently serves as an Amyotha Hluttaw MP for Mon State No. 10 constituency. He is a member of the National League for Democracy.

Early life and education
Soe Thiha was  born on 1 January 1974 in Mudon, Mon State, Myanmar. He educated in Government Technical Institute (GTI) in Mawlamyine for second year. He opened tea shop in Paung.

Political career
He is a member of the National League for Democracy. In the 2015 Myanmar general election, he was elected as an Amyotha Hluttaw MP and elected representative from Mon State No. 10 parliamentary constituency.

References

National League for Democracy politicians
1974 births
Living people
People from Mon State